Michael James Denham White FRS (London, 20 August 1910 – Canberra, 16 December 1983) was a zoologist and cytologist.

White grew up in Tuscany, Italy, where he was home-schooled, before beginning undergraduate studies at University College London from 1927. He later held the posts of Reader in Zoology at UCL, Professor of Zoology at the University of Texas, Professor of Zoology (1958–1964) and Professor of Genetics (1964–1975) at the University of Melbourne, Australia, before ending his academic career at the Australian National University. He was elected a Fellow of the Royal Society in 1961, and won the Linnaean Medal of the Linnean Society of London in 1983. He was a member of the American Philosophical Society, the American Academy of Arts and Sciences, and the United States National Academy of Sciences.

White made important contributions to the development of cytology and cytogenetics. His work was influential in the study of speciation in biology.

Books

White M.J.D. and Webb G.C. Blattodea, Mantodea, Isoptera, Grylloblattodea, Phasmatodea, Dermaptera, and Embioptera. Borntraeger.  (3-443-26005-5)
White M.J.D. (ed). Genetic mechanisms of speciation in insects. Symposia at the XIVth International Congress of Entomology, Canberra, Australia, 22–30 August 1972. Australian Academy of Science, Australian Entomological Society. Reidel.  (90-277-0477-5)

References

External links
MJD White;University of Melbourne Archives

1910 births
1983 deaths
Academic staff of the University of Melbourne
20th-century Australian zoologists
20th-century British zoologists
Fellows of the Royal Society
Fellows of the Australian Academy of Science
Foreign associates of the National Academy of Sciences
Members of the American Philosophical Society